Jumma Masjid or Jama Masjid is a mosque in Uparkot Fort in Junagadh, Gujarat, India. The mosque was built in 15th century by converting a temple or a palace now identified as Ranakdevi Mahal by local people. There is a controversy surrounding the identification of the structure.

History

The Jumma Masjid (Friday Mosque) was built by Mahmud Begada in 15th century following capture of Junagadh in 1472. It is evidently constructed from the materials of a Hindu or Jain temple or previously existing palace. The palace is now identified as Ranakdevi Mahal by local people attributing it to Ranakdevi, the legendary queen of Chudasama ruler Khengara.

The Jumma Masjid and cannons are enlisted as the State Protected Monument (S-GJ-115) by Archaeology Department of the Government of Gujarat. In 2020, the Gujarat tourism department placed a board marking the place as Jami Masjid–Ranakdevi Mahal. The local Rajput community objected to the identification as a mosque and protested. Later the board was removed. 

As of 2020, it is being restored under Uperkot fort restoration project of the Government of Gujarat.

Architecture
The mosque is built on a brick platform and looks like a citadel. It has solid thick walls and a slim column rising from a corner. The column looks more like a turret than a minaret. The mosque was never finished and the part of its hall is open to sky. There is a staircase leading to terraced roof. It was reinstalled during the restoration.

Cannons 
Facing the walls, outside the mosque, there is a huge bell-metal cannon called Nilam which has 10 inch bore, and is 17 feet long and 4 feet 8 inch round at the mouth. This cannon was brought from Diu, where it was left by the Ottoman admiral Suleyman Pasha following their defeat in siege of Diu (1538) while assisting Gujarat Sultanate against their struggle with Portuguese. There is an Arabic inscription at the muzzle, which may be translated: "The order to make this cannon, to be used in the service of the Almighty, was given by the Sultan of Arabia and Persia, Sultan Sulaiman, son of Salim Khan. May his triumph be glorified, to punish the enemies of the State and of the Faith, in the capital of Egypt, 1531." At the breech is inscribed: "The work of Muhamman, the son of Hamzah." Another large cannon called Kadanal, also from Diu, in the southern portion of the fort, is 13 feet long, and has a muzzle 4 feet in diameter.

Gallery

See also
 Uparkot Fort
 Uparkot Caves

References

Junagadh
Palaces in Gujarat
Tourist attractions in Junagadh district
Mosques in Gujarat
15th-century mosques
Religious buildings and structures converted into mosques